Sadık Necmettin Sadak (1890 in Isparta, Ottoman Empire – 21 September 1953 in New York City) was a Turkish politician, former minister of Foreign Affairs of Turkey and former chairman of the Turkish sports club Galatasaray.

Biography
After graduating from Galatasaray High School in 1910, he studied Humanities in the University of Lyon, France, until 1914. After his return to Turkey, he started to work in fields of sociology. In 1918 he was one of the co-founders of the newspaper Akşam.

In 1928 he was elected as member of national parliament from Sivas province . His political success continued and he was elected again for five consecutive times to parliament. He represented Turkey many times in international conferences. Between 1947 and 1950, he was the Minister of Foreign Affairs of Turkey. Sadak also elected as the chairman of Galatasaray in 1928. Although there was no national football league established in Turkey in the 1920s, Galatasaray won an Istanbul League title, while Sadak was the president.

References
 Portalistan.com – Necmettin Sadık Sadak
 Biyografi.net – Biography of Necmettin Sadak
 Galatasaray.org – Presidents of Galatasaray Sports Club

External links
 

1890 births
1953 deaths
Galatasaray S.K. presidents
Ministers of Foreign Affairs of Turkey
Galatasaray High School alumni
University of Lyon alumni
Akşam people
Members of the 16th government of Turkey
Members of the 17th government of Turkey
Members of the 18th government of Turkey